What the fuck may refer to:

 an expression (also abbreviated WTF), see 
 What the Fuck, a 2005 album by Acumen Nation
 "What the Fuck...", a 1994 song by Brand Nubian song from Everything is Everything
 "What the Fuck", a 2007 song by Carbon/Silicon from their album The Last Post
 "What the Fuck", a 2013 song by fun from their extended play Before Shane Went to Bangkok: Live in the USA
 WTFPL (Do What the Fuck You Want To Public License)

See also
 What the Bleep Do We Know!?, sometimes stylised as "What tнē #$*! D̄ө ωΣ (k)πow!?" and "What the #$*! Do We Know!?", a 2004 film purporting to link spirituality and quantum mechanics.
 Star 69 (What the F**k), a 2001 song by Fatboy Slim
 WTF (disambiguation)
 What the (disambiguation)

English phrases